Deborah Davies may refer to:

Deborah Kay Davies, Welsh author
Debbie Davies, guitarist

See also
Deborah Davis (disambiguation)